Anatoly Alexandrovich Maslov is a Russian physicist, professor of Aerohydrodynamics Department at the Novosibirsk State Technical University, specialist in the field of laminar-turbulent transition.

Biography
In 1973, Anatoly Maslov defended his Ph.D. thesis "Stability of a compressible boundary layer over a cooled surface"; in 1988, he defended his doctoral dissertation "The onset of turbulence in supersonic boundary layers". In the same year, the scientist became the head of Laboratory No.13 of Physical Problems of Control of Gas-Dynamic Flows at the Khristianovich Institute of Theoretical and Applied Mechanics. Thanks to the skills of experimental work and numerical simulation in supersonic aerodynamics, as well as experience in large aerodynamic installations, he significantly intensified the scientific activity of the laboratory.

Suspicion of state treason and arrest
On June 28, 2022, Anatoly Maslov was arrested on suspicion of state treason. He was taken by plane to Moscow and placed in the Lefortovo pre-trial detention center.  A few days later, another Novosibirsk scientist Dmitry Kolker was also arrested on suspicion of state treason.

See also
 Valentin Danilov
 Alexandr Shiplyuk
 Dmitri Kolker

References

Living people
20th-century Russian physicists
21st-century Russian physicists
Aerodynamicists
Scientists from Novosibirsk
Russian prisoners and detainees
Prisoners and detainees of Russia
Year of birth missing (living people)